Peter Angelo Bessone (January 13, 1913 — December 5, 1989) was an American ice hockey player and coach. Bessone played 6 games in the National Hockey League with the Detroit Red Wings during the 1937–38 season. The rest of his career, which lasted from 1931 to 1952, was mainly spent in the American Hockey League, though he also spent time in the French, Swiss, and Italian national leages. Internationally Bessone played for the American national team at the 1934 World Championships, where he won a silver medal. He was inducted into the United States Hockey Hall of Fame in 1978.

Career

Early career
As a high school student, Pete Bessone was a three-sport athlete at West Springfield, High, playing football, baseball and, ice hockey. Following his completion of high school Bessone began his hockey career locally playing in Springfield, Massachusetts for the West Side Ranges.  In 1931 Bessone left the united States to play hockey in France, he joined the Rapides de Paris, leading to a very successful French career. While playing for Stade Français, Bessone was considered the top hockey draw in France and some even called him the Babe Ruth of hockey in Paris.

In 1934 Bessone represented the United States at the World Championships in Milan, Italy. In the semi-final versus Germany, Bessone scored two of the US' three goals. The Americans took the Silver medal finishing only behind Canada.

Return to the States
Following the 1936 season Bessone returned from France, with the intention of playing professionally in North America. Bessone joined the Pittsburgh Yellowjackets of the EAHL, where he scored six goals and 10 points through 47 games. He so impressed that season that he was offered a contract by the NHL's Detroit Red Wings. Bassone began the 1937-38 season with Detroit Pontiacs, a Red Wings' farm team. Thanks to an injury to Wing's defensemen Ebbie Goodfellow Bessone was called up, making his debut on January 16, 1938 against the Montreal Maroons. After his debut Bessone was believed to be a solid prospect. However, after only six games with the Red Wings and 15 with the Pontiacs Bassone was sent to the Pittsburgh Hornets of the AHL; he would never play in the NHL again.

AHL career
Bessone continued to play for the Hornets for the next five years. In 1942 Bessone was selected to start in the AHL's first All-star game. The game was held in Cleveland, Ohio, with the intent of to raise money in support of American and Canadian armed forces serving in World War II, the contest raised $4,132 towards this goal. Bessone's long tenure in Pittsburgh finally came to a close in 1943 when the Hornets traded Bessone to the Cleveland Barons for defensemen Fred Robertson.

Bessone spent three seasons in Cleveland. His short time with the Barons however saw the high point of Bessone's career, as the Barons won the 1944-45 Calder Cup as league champions. It was the only North American Championship Bessone would win.
After his time in Cleveland Bessone spent one more year in the AHL playing for the Providence Reds.

Post playing career
In 1947 Bessone returned to France to be the head coach of the Paris Racing Club hockey team. He coached them for two seasons before returning to the states to coach the Springfield Indians of the IHL he would play 4 games as a player-coach. Following the 1949-50 season Bessone retired from hockey for good.

In 1978 Bessone was inducted into the United States Hockey Hall of fame, 14 years later he was joined by his brother Amo Bessone.

Career statistics

Regular season and playoffs

International

References

External links
 

1913 births
1989 deaths
American ice hockey coaches
American men's ice hockey defensemen
Cleveland Barons (1937–1973) players
Detroit Red Wings players
HC Milano players
Ice hockey coaches from Massachusetts
Ice hockey players from Massachusetts
Neuchâtel Young Sprinters HC players
Pittsburgh Hornets players
Providence Reds players
Sportspeople from New Bedford, Massachusetts
United States Hockey Hall of Fame inductees